Jameh Mosque of Hamadan in Hamadan, built during the Qajar dynasty.

References

Mosques in Iran
Mosque buildings with domes
National works of Iran